"Bartlet for America" is the tenth episode of the third season of American serial political drama The West Wing. The episode aired on December 12, 2001 on NBC. The episode features Leo McGarry, the White House Chief of Staff, testifying before a congressional committee after it is revealed that the administration has been covering up the President's multiple sclerosis. Reception of the episode was mostly positive, and the slogan of "Bartlet for America" has been reprised in popular culture and real-life American politics.

Plot 
The episode centers around the continuation of a storyline in which Democratic President Josiah Bartlet publicly admits that he was diagnosed with multiple sclerosis and concealed it from the public throughout his campaign for the presidency. In this episode, set in the Christmas holiday season, Leo McGarry has been served with a subpoena to testify before the United States House Committee on Oversight and Reform as a high-ranking official in the Bartlet campaign and one of Bartlet's closest friends.

Leo is asked by the committee how he initially persuaded Jed Bartlet to run for office, causing the show to flash back to a scene where Leo stops by Bartlet's office as Governor of New Hampshire. In trying to persuade him to run for President, Leo pulls out a cocktail napkin, licks it, and sticks it on a nearby easel, revealing that it reads "Bartlet for America".

A recess is called when Leo, while being questioned by Congressman Darren Gibson, admits that Bartlet had a previously undisclosed multiple sclerosis "attack" while campaigning for office, on the night of the third debate. Leo tells his lawyer that on the night of the debate, he was meeting with Gibson, then a CEO, and another wealthy individual; he trying to shore up the campaign's money. Leo tries to avoid the drinks offered to him without revealing that he is a recovering alcoholic, but ends up having a glass of scotch. After the two leave, Leo gets drunk, and when Congressman Gibson re-enters the room—having forgotten his wallet—he sees the several empty bottles Leo has left on the table. Meanwhile, the Republican Senate Majority Leader and Majority Counsel Cliff Calley have pulled Gibson into another room, where he tells them the same story and signals his intent to use the debate collapse as an excuse to publicize Leo's story and embarrass him. Calley objects, telling Gibson that the questioning is immoral and irrelevant. At Calley's urging, the Majority Leader postpones the hearings until after the Christmas holidays. Later, President Bartlet gives Leo a Christmas present in his office, which he unwraps, revealing the original napkin that read "Bartlet for America" in a picture frame. "That was awfully nice of you", says the President, before turning to leave. The episode closes with a shot of Leo crying at his desk, holding the frame.

Cast

Reception 

The tagline "Bartlet for America" and the napkin have seen enduring significance since the show's airing, with Vulture referring to the episode as, in part, "the saga of the fateful napkin". The Nevada Independent writes that when then-Congresswoman Jacky Rosen was "fairly certain" that she would campaign in the 2018 United States Senate election in Nevada, she asked her daughter about the prospect. She responded by writing "Rosen for Senate" on a napkin, which is currently preserved in the Rosens' home. Steve Heisler with The A.V. Club, however, made a point of distinguishing a slogan that advertised the candidate for a people rather than an office, comparing "Bartlet for America" to "Bartlet for President". Heisler argues that in writing "Bartlet for America", Leo signaled that he thought Josiah Bartlet was the best man to strengthen the nation, and not just the best man for the presidency. A later article in The A.V. Club by Sonia Saraiya would argue that Bartlet's re-election campaign, as well as "Bartlet for America", served as the fictional precursor to and foundation for Barack Obama's presidential campaigns and "Obama for America".

Heisler further commented in a 2010 article that the show was really about Leo, despite its title. He praised John Spencer's acting during the episode, calling it his "best episode by far" and noting his capacity for emotional range as well as dry wit.

Ben Travers, writing for IndieWire, listed the episode as one of fifteen episodes to "Binge View In Celebration of America". Travers quipped that if NBC had sold framed "Bartlet for America' napkins, they would have made more of a profit than their selling Friends coffee mugs. He also commented that the scene with Cliff Calley and Gibson was not realistic, but that Sorkin made it believable through "impeccable timing, careful framing, and touching performances".

The napkin would later reappear as a prop in A West Wing Special to Benefit When We All Vote, a 2020 benefit production of Hartsfield's Landing.

In 2019, NBC News noted that Wayne Messam, the mayor of Miramar, Florida, had a campaign logo for the 2020 United States presidential election that read "Wayne for America", which the outlet commented was "not dissimilar" to "Bartlet for America".

References

External links
 

The West Wing (season 3) episodes
2001 American television episodes